The 2016 Tour de San Luis was a road cycling stage race that took place in Argentina between 18 and 24 January 2016. It was the tenth edition of the Tour de San Luis. The race was used by many European-based riders as the beginning of their 2016 road seasons. It was rated as a 2.1 event as part of the 2016 UCI America Tour. The defending champion is the Argentine cyclist Daniel Díaz.

The race took place over seven days. The first stage was a team time trial; there were also two stages suitable for sprinters, two suitable for riders who can both climb and sprint, and two mountain-top finishes suitable for the best climbers.

Another  rider, Fernando Gaviria, won the second stage and took over the race lead. He lost this the following day to Peter Koning, who won in a solo breakaway. The first mountain stage was won by Eduardo Sepúlveda, giving him a three-second advantage over Dayer Quintana. This was maintained through the following stage, won in a solo breakaway. The final mountain stage was won by Miguel Ángel López, with Quintana taking enough time out of Sepúlveda to put himself into the race lead. The final sprint stage was won by Jakub Mareczko (Italy), with Quintana taking the overall win.

Participating teams 

The race organisers selected 28 teams to take part in the race, including 7 UCI WorldTeams. There were also six UCI Professional Continental teams, seven UCI Continental teams and eight national teams.

Pre-race favourites 

The Tour de San Luis is one of the earliest races in the cycling calendar. It takes place at the same time as the Tour Down Under, which takes place in Australia. The Tour de San Luis takes place on far more mountainous terrain than the Tour Down Under and is used by many riders, especially climbers, as a way to begin the season.

The general classification is expected to be decided in the two mountainous stages and the team time trial. The contest involves both riders from the top European teams who are beginning their seasons and also riders from South America who are in the middle of their summer. Many of the South American riders use the Tour de San Luis to prepare for their national championships.

Because so many of the European riders were beginning their seasons at the race, it was unclear which were in good form. There were two riders from European teams who had won the Tour de San Luis in the past. Nairo Quintana had won the 2014 race and had come third in 2015; he was one of the principal favourites for the overall victory. Another favourite was Vincenzo Nibali, who won the 2010 race and who came to the race with the intention to compete for the overall victory. Other riders from WorldTeams with a chance of victory included Quintana's teammate Daniel Moreno, Nibali's teammate Miguel Ángel López, Rafał Majka, Jean-Christophe Péraud and Andrew Talansky.

The principal South American favourite was the defending champion, Daniel Díaz. Díaz had won the 2015 edition and the 2013 edition. Díaz, an Argentine rider, had moved to a higher-level team for the 2016 season – the UCI Professional Continental  – and was expected to be highly motivated for the race. His team, however, was expected to struggle in the team time trial. Other South American riders with a chance of victory included Rodolfo Torres, who was second in 2015, and Eduardo Sepúlveda.

Several other riders came to the race hoping for stage victories. These included Peter Sagan (Tinkoff), who was looking for his first victory in the rainbow jersey he wore as the 2015 road race world champion, Fernando Gaviria, who won two races in the 2015 Tour de San Luis and Elia Viviani (riding for the Italian national team).

Route and stages 

The race will include seven stages. The first will be a  team time trial. The fourth stage finishes with the climb of the Alto del Amago. There is a shorter uphill finish the following day, which is unlikely to cause significant time gaps. There is another mountain stage on the sixth day, however; it finishes on the Filo Sierras Comechingones, which is described by Cycling Weekly as "fearsome". The final stage will be held on a circuit in San Luis itself and will again suit the sprinters.

Stage 1 

Stage 1 was a  team time trial around El Durazno over rolling terrain, with no significant or difficult climbs.

The Colombian rider Carlos Alzate was the first UnitedHealthcare rider to cross the line. Eventually,  took over the lead by finishing 31 seconds ahead of UnitedHealthcare.

At this point there were four teams left to race. The Continental-level team Holowesko–Citadel finished well down the field, but the remaining teams were all WorldTeams with contenders for the overall victory. , led across the line by Vincenzo Nibali, finished 17 seconds behind Etixx–Quick-Step.  were much further back, losing nearly a minute.

Etixx–Quick-Step therefore won the stage; Maximiliano Richeze was the first to finish and so he was the first individual leader of the race. The win also put Rodrigo Contreras, the defending champion of the youth classification, into the lead of that competition. Nairo Quintana was the best-placed of the general classification riders; he took time out of all his rivals. This was in large part due to the work of his teammate Adriano Malori.

||

|}
|}

Stage 2 

19 January – San Luis – Villa Mercedes,

Stage 3 

20 January – Potrero de Los Funes – La Punta,

Stage 4 

21 January – Terrazas del Portezuelo – Cerro El Amago,

Stage 5 

22 January – Renca – Juana Koslay,

Stage 6 

23 January – La Toma – Filo de la Sierra de Comechingones,

Stage 7 

24 January – San Luis – San Luis,

Classification leadership table

References

External links 

 

2016
2016 in Argentine sport
2016 UCI America Tour
January 2016 sports events in South America